Calamophylliopsis is a genus of extinct stony corals. They lived from the Early Jurassic to Late Oligocene (around 189 to 23 Ma).

Species 

 C. cervina
 C. compacta
 C. compressa
 C. crassa
 C. elegans
 C. etalloni
 C. flabellum
 C. fotisalensis
 C. klothoensis
 C. kyrvakarensis
 C. lombricalis
 C. marini
 C. moreauana
 C. sandbergeri
 C. simonyi
 C. stockesi
 C. vidali
 C. alternicosta

Distribution 
Fossils of Calamophylliopsis have been registered in:

Jurassic
Azerbaijan, Bulgaria, China, Colombia (Coquina Group, La Guajira), Croatia, the Czech Republic, Ethiopia, France, Georgia, Germany, Indonesia, Iran, Morocco, Myanmar, Oman, Poland, Portugal, Romania, the Russian Federation, Serbia and Montenegro, Slovakia, Slovenia, Spain, Switzerland, Thailand, Turkmenistan, Ukraine, the United Kingdom, and Uzbekistan.

Cretaceous
Bulgaria, China, Croatia, the Czech Republic, France, Georgia, Greece, Iran, Mexico, Poland, Romania, Slovenia, Spain, Switzerland, Trinidad and Tobago, USSR, Ukraine, United States (Arizona), Uzbekistan, and Venezuela.

Paleocene
France

Eocene
Croatia

Oligocene
Slovenia

See also 

 List of prehistoric hexacoral genera

References 

Dermosmiliidae
Scleractinia genera
Prehistoric Hexacorallia genera
Mesozoic animals of Africa
Mesozoic animals of Asia
Mesozoic animals of Europe
Mesozoic animals of North America
Cretaceous Mexico
Cretaceous United States
Mesozoic animals of South America
Jurassic Colombia
Cretaceous Venezuela
Paleogene animals of Europe
Early Jurassic first appearances
Oligocene extinctions
Fossil taxa described in 1952
Fossils of Serbia